The 2016–17 Southeastern Louisiana Lions basketball team represented Southeastern Louisiana University during the 2016–17 NCAA Division I men's basketball season. The Lions, led by third-year head coach Jay Ladner, played their home games at the University Center in Hammond, Louisiana  as members of the Southland Conference. They finished the season 16–16, 9–9 in Southland play to finish in seventh place. They lost in the first round of the Southland tournament to Lamar.

Previous season
The Lions finished the 2015–16 season 12–21, 9–9 in Southland play to finish in sixth place. They defeated New Orleans in the first round of the Southland tournament before losing to Houston Baptist in the quarterfinals.

Roster

Schedule and results

|-
!colspan=9 style=| Exhibition

|-
!colspan=9 style=| Non-conference regular season

|-
|-
!colspan=9 style=|Southland regular season

|-
!colspan=9 style=| Southland tournament

See also
2016–17 Southeastern Louisiana Lady Lions basketball team

References

Southeastern Louisiana Lions basketball seasons
Southeastern Louisiana
Southeastern Louisiana Lions basketball
Southeastern Louisiana Lions basketball